Birajit Sinha is the State President of Indian National Congress and a well known politician from Tripura, India representing Kailashahar as an MLA for 6th term in Tripura Legislative Assembly

Early life and career 
Birajit Sinha joined student politics at the age of 17 in 1969, and has been an active member of Indian National Congress since 1972. He was appointed president of Tripura State Youth Congress in 1978 and continued in the role until 1990. He also served as a Cabinet Minister in Tripura from 1988 to 1993. He held a number of leadership roles in Indian National Congress, including membership of the National Council of Indian Youth Congress and the All India Congress Committee.

He was first elected as a member of the Tripura Legislative Assembly in 1988 and was a cabinet minister from 1988 to 1993. He was again elected in 1998 and was Deputy Leader of Opposition in the Tripura Legislative Assembly from 1998 to 2000. In 2003 Legislative Assembly elections he was the State Congress President and the chief ministerial candidate of INC where he was re-elected from his seat but the party couldn't get the majority. 

In 2008 Legislative Assembly elections  2013 Legislative Assembly elections, he was re-elected to represent Kailashahar constituency. He was appointed the President of the Tripura Pradesh Congress Committee on 9 January 2015.

He was again appointed as the President of Tripura Pradesh Congress Committee in 2021 becoming the only state leader to be given the charge of President Tripura Pradesh Congress Committee for 3 terms.

In 2023 Legislative Assembly elections he contested from Kailashahar and won with 9686 votes against BJP rival securing the highest margin ever recorded from the constituency. He is representing Kailashahar for the 6th term, which is also highest number of representation in the constituency by an individual.

Countries Visited :	 
Visited Oman in 1983 (as a member of Indian delegation to attend international Youth Festival), 
Visited China in 1985 ( as a member of Indian delegation to attend International Youth Festival)

Other activities 
Birajit Sinha is engaged with various social activities. He is the Founder President of ASHRAY – a registered social voluntary organisation working on the program areas of healthcare, welfare and national development. He is also involved with health camps and blood donation camps in rural and remote tribal areas. He is the Vice President of the Committee for National Integration, a national based organisation that promotes national integration and communal harmony. He was awarded the Rashtriya Ekta Puraskar in 2000 for outstanding contributions to communal harmony in Tripura.

References

Indian National Congress politicians from Tripura
People from Unakoti district
Living people
1950s births
Tripura MLAs 1998–2003
Tripura MLAs 2003–2008
Tripura MLAs 2008–2013
Tripura MLAs 2013–2018
Tripura MLAs 1988–1993